Garth Marenghi is a fictional horror author created by English comedians Matthew Holness and Richard Ayoade and portrayed by Holness. He is depicted as a conceited hack writer, who remains blissfully (or even wilfully) unaware of his lack of talent.

The character has appeared in two stage shows, the Perrier Award-nominated Garth Marenghi's Fright Knight and Perrier Award-winning Garth Marenghi's Netherhead, and the Channel 4 TV series Garth Marenghi's Darkplace and Man to Man with Dean Learner.

After winning the Perrier Award, the creators confounded media sources by refusing to speak out of character, or give real names or backgrounds.

Character
Garth Marenghi is a spoof pulp horror author; his act and his works are considered a parody of the horror genre. The name "Garth Marenghi" is an anagram of the phrase "argh nightmare."

The character is highly conceited and narcissistic, often describing himself through epithets such as "the dream weaver", "shaman", "titan of terror", "The One Man Fear Factory" and "master of the macabre." In interviews, he compares himself positively with James Joyce, Shakespeare, Leonardo da Vinci, and Jesus.

Despite this, Marenghi displays a general ignorance of many subjects of which he claims knowledge. He claims to be self-taught, having left school young ("I knew by the age of eight that my education had finished"), and despite his claims to being a literary genius he rarely reads books. When he needs to learn about a subject, he will "hire someone to go and find out about it." In both stage shows, in the official website, and in numerous interviews he claims to have written more books than he has read.

Marenghi displays other traits including sexism, xenophobia, and extreme paranoia. He is depicted as married with four daughters, though disappointed at not having a son. The Darkplace episode "Skipper the Eye Child" explains this, and references this in its plot with Marenghi's character Rick Dagless shown as having a deceased son who was half boy, half grasshopper. During the DVD feature 'Darkplace Illuminatum' Marenghi draws further comparisons with himself and Dagless. He comments "In many ways he is an extension of my own natural abilities. He's got a little more than me. He is a little more tragic than I am, as a character. He's seen the dark side. A little too much."

Garth Marenghi's Darkplace 

The show Garth Marenghi's Darkplace is based on the premise that Garth Marenghi wrote and starred in a 1980s low-budget hospital-based horror show. Within this fictional context, 50 shows were created, but were never shown as they were suppressed by "MI-8" for being "too subversive, too dangerous, too damn scary."

Many jokes are based on the premise that Garth Marenghi not only created and wrote the series, but also plays the central character. As such, characters reflect Marenghi's world-view, and his own characterDoctor Rick Dagless, M.D.exhibits many characteristics of a Mary Sue.

Other television appearances
Marenghi also guests in the first episode of Dean Learner's talk series, Man to Man with Dean Learner, where he reveals that he lost an ear in an ambulance crash, has written a total of 436 books, and has filmed a new movie, War of the Wasps, featuring most of the cast of Garth Marenghi's Darkplace.

Garth Marenghi's TerrorTome 
Matthew Holness published Garth Marenghi's TerrorTome, written as Garth Marenghi in November 2022; it is available as a hardback, ebook and audiobook. Release of the book was followed by a book tour, where Holness would read extracts of the book in-character of Marenghi and then conduct a Q&A with the audience.

References

External links
 Official website 
 O.S.T Show Matthew Holness as Garth Marenghi on Resonance FM's OST Show

Fictional actors
Fictional writers
Fictional Vietnam War veterans
Garth Marenghi's Darkplace
Fictional English people